The  is a Japanese Shinkansen high-speed train type built for Komachi services which commenced on 3 June 1997, coinciding with the opening of the new Akita Shinkansen "mini-shinkansen" line, a regular  narrow-gauge line between  and  re-gauged to . Later versions of the E3 series were also introduced for use on Yamagata Shinkansen Tsubasa services. Both "mini-shinkansen" lines join the Tohoku Shinkansen, providing services to and from Tokyo.

Design
The design of the original Akita Shinkansen E3 series trains was overseen by industrial designer Kenji Ekuan. Like the 400 Series Shinkansen, these trains are built to a smaller loading gauge than mainline Shinkansen trains—the width and length of each car is reduced to fit on the narrower clearances of the "mini-shinkansen". Doorway steps fold out to bridge the gap between the narrow body and the platform at regular shinkansen stations.

Variants
 E3 series "R" sets: 26 x 6-car sets used on Akita Shinkansen Komachi services since 3 June 1997
 E3-1000 series "LR" sets: 3 x 7-car sets used on Yamagata Shinkansen Tsubasa services since 4 December 1999
 E3-2000 series "LR" sets: 12 x 7-car sets used on Yamagata Shinkansen Tsubasa services since 20 December 2008
 E3-700 series Toreiyu: 6-car excursion trainset used on Yamagata Shinkansen from July 2014
 E3-700 series Genbi Shinkansen: 6-car excursion trainset used on Joetsu Shinkansen from 29 April 2016 to December 2020.

Pre-series set
A pre-series 5-car set, numbered S8, was delivered from Kawasaki Heavy Industries to Sendai Depot in March 1995 for extensive testing. It was modified to full-production specifications in March 1997 ahead of the start of Akita Shinkansen services.

Until it was augmented to six cars in 1998, the pre-series was formed as follows, with scissors-type pantographs on cars 12, 13, and 14. Set R1 was withdrawn following its final revenue run on 20 July 2013.

E3 series "R" sets

The full-production trainsets built from 1996 for the Akita Shinkansen were 5-car sets, but sixth cars were added by the end of 1998. A total of 26 Akita Shinkansen sets were in service by the end of 2005. Sets R1 to R16 were leased by East Japan Railway Company (JR East) from the owning company, a third-sector company jointly owned by JR East and Akita Prefecture. This lease ended on 21 March 2010 with the dissolution of Akita Shinkansen Sharyō Hoyū.

The E3 series sets are scheduled to be phased out following the introduction of new E6 series sets from March 2013, with 19 sets (114 vehicles) scheduled to be withdrawn during fiscal 2013.

From the start of the 15 March 2014 timetable revision, E3 series trainsets were no longer used on Akita Shinkansen Komachi services. Two sets remained in service, used on Yamabiko and Nasuno services.

Formation

Cars 12 and 15 are equipped with PS206 single-arm pantographs.

Fleet history

The build details are as shown below. , the last of the original 26 sets (R22) was scrapped.

Notes

Interior

E3-1000 series

Three 7-car E3-1000 sets (numbered L51 – L53) were built between 1999 and 2005 for use on Yamagata Shinkansen Tsubasa services from 4 December 1999 to augment the 400 series fleet following with the extension of the line to Shinjo. From 2014, a further two sets (L54 and L55) were introduced, reformed from withdrawn Akita Shinkansen E3-0 series "R" sets, to replace the two older sets L51 and L52.

Formation
The sets are formed as shown below, with five motored ("M") cars and two non-powered trailer ("T") cars, and car 11 at the Tokyo end.

Cars 12 and 14 are equipped with PS206 single-arm pantographs.

Interior

Fleet history

The build details are as shown below.

L54/L55 conversion details

The former identities of the cars reformed into sets L54 and L55 are as shown below.

E3-2000 series

The first of a fleet of twelve new E3-2000 series 7-car sets entered service on Yamagata Shinkansen Tsubasa services on 20 December 2008. The new fleet totally replaced the older 400 series trains by summer 2009. The new trains incorporate design improvements, including active suspension, full-color LED destination indicators, and AC power outlets in all cars. Seating capacity in cars 16 and 17 has been reduced by 4 (one row of seats) compared with the E3-1000 series to provide uniform seating pitch in all cars (seat pitch was previously reduced in non-reserved cars).

Formation

Cars 12 and 14 are equipped with PS206 single-arm pantographs.

Fleet history
, the E3-2000 series fleet is as follows.

Interior

Repainting

Current livery 

From spring 2014, the entire fleet of 15 E3-1000 and E3-2000 series Tsubasa sets were gradually repainted into a new livery designed by industrial designer Ken Okuyama. The new livery consists of white, evoking the snow of Mount Zaō, deep purple inspired by the Mandarin duck, the prefectural bird for Yamagata Prefecture, together with yellow and red for the safflower, the prefectural flower of Yamagata Prefecture. The first repainted set is appeared in late April. Three sets were repainted by June 2014, and the rest of the fleet of 15 sets was repainted by mid 2016.

Original livery (2023 revision) 
On 11 February 2023, set L65 was repainted into the original silver and green livery used at the time of introduction to Tsubasa services last seen in 2016. According to JR East, the repainting was done to promote the Yamagata Shinkansen.

E3-700 series Toreiyu excursion set

This was a six-car set rebuilt from former Akita Shinkansen trainset R18 as an excursion train named  for use on the Yamagata Shinkansen between Fukushima and Shinjo, which entered service from July 2014. The design work for the rebuilt train was overseen by industrial designer Ken Okuyama. The six-car set had a total seating capacity of 143 passengers. Car 11 was a standard-class car with reserved seating arranged 2+2 abreast, cars 12 to 14 featured Japanese-style tatami seating, car 15 was a lounge car with a bar counter, and car 16 was ashiyu foot baths. The name of the train is a portmanteau of the English word "train" and the French word "soleil" (sun). The train was normally used on special Toreiyu Tsubasa services running at weekends. The train was discontinued in March of 2022.

Formation
The Toreiyu set was based at Yamagata Depot and formed as shown below, with car 11 at the Fukushima end.

E3-700 series Genbi Shinkansen excursion set

The train began operations on 29 April 2016, mostly on weekends and holidays. It was withdrawn from service on 19 December 2020. 

The exterior livery was designed by photographer Mika Ninagawa. The first car of the six car set featured the art of Nao Matsumoto; a golden yellow motif based on harvests, festivals and light was present in the car. Window shades displayed art using a special dye as the train passes through tunnels. The second car featured stainless steel mirrors on the walls, the work of Yusuke Komuta. They reflect the landscape outside the train. The third car featured a children's area and a cafe. The children's area featured blue and white representations of toy trains by Art Unit Paramodel. The cafe section of the car was designed by Kentaro Kobuke and served sweet items featuring local products. The fourth car featured an alpine photography exhibition by Naoki Ishikawa. The fifth car featured an abstract flower artpiece by Haruka Koujin that vibrated with the motion of the train. The final car featured a short film by Brian Alfred, depicting the scenery of Niigata. The trainset was shown off to the media on 12 January 2016.

Formation
The Genbi Shinkansen set was based at Niigata Depot and formed as shown below, with car 11 at the Tokyo end.

Cars 12 and 15 each have one single-arm pantograph.

See also
 List of high-speed trains

References

External links

 E3 Series Tsubasa/Yamabiko/Nasuno 

Shinkansen train series
East Japan Railway Company
Kawasaki multiple units
Tokyu Car multiple units
Train-related introductions in 1997
Passenger trains running at least at 250 km/h in commercial operations
20 kV AC multiple units
25 kV AC multiple units